is a railway station in the city of Takizawa, Iwate Prefecture, Japan, operated by the Iwate Ginga Railway.

Lines
Sugo Station is served by the Iwate Ginga Railway Line, and is located 10.2 kilometers from the terminus of the line at Morioka Station and 545.5 kilometers from Tokyo Station. Trains of the Hanawa Line, which officially terminates at  usually continue on to Morioka Station, stopping at all intermediate stations, including Aoyama Station.

Station layout
Sugo Station has two opposed side platforms connected to the station building by a footbridge.  The platforms are at different elevations. The station is staffed. The ticket machine operates from 5:30 a.m. to the midnight.

Platforms

History
Sugo Station was opened on 18 March 2006.

Passenger statistics
In fiscal 2015, the station was used by an average of 994 passengers daily.

Surrounding area
  Japan National Route 4

References

External links

  

Railway stations in Iwate Prefecture
Iwate Galaxy Railway Line
Railway stations in Japan opened in 2006
Takizawa, Iwate